Takanabe Bosai Dam  is an earthfill dam located in Miyazaki Prefecture in Japan. The dam is used for flood control and irrigation. The catchment area of the dam is 13.4 km2. The dam impounds about 14  ha of land when full and can store 1194 thousand cubic meters of water. The construction of the dam was completed in 1968.

See also
List of dams in Japan

References

Dams in Miyazaki Prefecture